North Dakota Highway 91 may refer to:

 North Dakota Highway 91 (Pembina County)
 North Dakota Highway 91 (Wells County)